Grădiștea is a commune in the northeastern part of Ilfov County, Muntenia, Romania. It is composed of two villages, Grădiștea and Sitaru. Its name is of Slavic origin and has the meaning of the Latin word castrum. The name was used by the Slavs to locate the ruins of the old Roman fortifications.

References

Communes in Ilfov County
Localities in Muntenia
Place names of Slavic origin in Romania